The following lists events that happened during 2016 in India.

Incumbents

Governors

Events
 National income - 153,916,690 million
 1 January – The Indian and Pakistani governments provided one another with a full list of nuclear sites, military and civilian, in accordance with the 1988 Non-Nuclear Aggression Agreement.
 2 January – Heavily armed gunmen, reportedly members of Jaish-e-Mohammed, attacked an Indian Air Force base in Pathankot, Punjab. Two of the gunmen were killed.
At least eight people were killed, 100 others were injured and some buildings were damaged.
17 January - A PhD student from University of Hyderabad named Rohith Vemula committed suicide due to Caste based discrimination. The event triggered a countrywide agitation against casteism in institutions of higher learning.
 8 February - Facebook's FreeBasics declared illegal in India and stopped services in the country.
 18 March - Ahead of polls in West Bengal and Tamil Nadu, Supreme Court of India allows pictures of Union Ministers, Chief Ministers, Governors and State Ministers to appear in government advertisements.
 5 April - Bihar state imposed liquor ban.
 5 April - India's fastest train Gatimaan Express started Operating between Hazrat Nizamuddin and Agra Cantonment by Indian Railways.
 2016 Ujjain Simhastha Kumbha Fair organized between 22 April and 21 May. Nearly 75  million people visited the fair during this one-month period.
 10 April – Puttingal temple fire caused 107 deaths.
 11 April – 2016 Assam Legislative Assembly election – BJP won the majority.
 5 May - 2016 West Bengal Legislative Assembly election – Mamata Banerjee-led TMC won majority.
 16 May - 2016 Tamil Nadu Legislative Assembly election- Jayalalithaa-led AIADMK won majority.
 16 May - 2016 Puducherry Legislative Assembly election – Congress won majority.
 23 May - Hypersonic Flight Experiment: The ISRO's RLV-TD vehicle was launched from the first launchpad of Satish Dhawan Space Centre on board an HS9 rocket booster.
 30 May - 30 died following fire in army weapon depot in Pulgaon, Wardha district, Maharashtra.
 22 June – ISRO send 20 satellites in space on PSLV-XL.
 25 June – 2016 Pampore attack.
 28 June – Government of India accepted 7th Pay Commission recommendations to increase salaries of employees.
2016 Kashmir unrest.
 2016 Indian Air Force An-32 disappearance.
 2 July - At least 30 died in heavy rains in Uttarakhand.
 3 August – Goods and Services Tax (India) Bill passed in Parliament.
 5 August – 2016 Kokrajhar shooting.
 9 August – Manipur activist Irom Sharmila ended her 16 years of hunger strike.
 14 August – Na. Muthukumar – died he was an Indian / Tamil poet, lyricist, and author National award winner.
 2 September - Indian general strike of 2016.
 Kaveri River water dispute: violence broke out in Karnataka.
 13 September – 43 out of 44 MLAs of Arunachal Pradesh Legislative Assembly left Congress and joined People's Party of Arunachal.
 18 September – Four terrorists attacked an Indian Army brigade headquarters in Uri, near the Line of Control in a pre-dawn ambush.        September 22- Tamil Nadu cm Jayalalithaa hospitalized at Apollo Hospital.
28 September- India Surgical Strike on Pakistan.

 30 September – Bihar liquor ban: Patna High Court struck down liquor ban law.
 2 October – 2016 Baramulla attack.
 11 October –  Jangaon district was formed in 2016 in Telangana.
 13 October – BJP joined People's Party of Arunachal- lead Government in Arunachal Pradesh.
 15 October – 24 died following stampede at religious meet in Varanasi.
 17 October – Fire in SUM Hospital in Bhubaneshwar. 22 died.
 19 October -Qnet multi-level marketing: former World Billiards Champion Michael Ferreira arrested.
 24 October – Cyrus Mistry was sacked as the Chairman of the Tata Sons. Tata was one of India's biggest conglomerate.
 27 October – Senari massacre case of Bihar: 15 convicted, 23 acquitted by court. 10 death sentence.
 October – Bihar liquor ban: Supreme Court stays High Court order, liquor ban reimposed.
 October – Samajwadi Party, ruling Uttar Pradesh, caught in family feud.
 31 October – October 2016 Bhopal encounter.
 1 November – 2016 Manipur unrest started.
 8 November – The Indian government withdraws 500 and 1000 banknotes with immediate effect. New notes will be issued to the nation. Caused political uproar.
 11 November – 42 Congress MLAs submitted their resignations to Punjab Vidhan Sabha following the Supreme Court order related to the Sutlej Yamuna link canal project.
 16 November- The winter session of Indian Parliament starts, with debate on note ban.
 20 November – A train derails near Pukhrayan killing at least 150 people.
 26 November – Nabha jailbreak in Punjab. 6 flee.
 29 November – 2016 Nagrota army base attack.
 30 November – Supreme Court of India ordered cinemas to play national anthem before films.
 5 December – Former Tamil Nadu Chief Minister J Jayalalithaa who has been hospitalized for 72 days in Apollo Hospital was officially announced as dead after having a heart attack.
 10 December – Industrialist Pawan Ruia arrested following railway complaint.
 12 December – Cyclone Vardah makes landfall on Tamil Nadu coast. 18 died.
 14 December – The National Green Tribunal banned kite-flying with manja, a thread coated in a sticky paste of ground-up glass, following outcry over deaths and injury caused by it.
 15 December – Supreme Court bans sale of liquor on national and state highways due to large number of road accidents caused by drunks every year.
 24 December – Prime Minister Narendra Modi laid the foundation the Pune Metro Project. Metro work starts off.
 December – 2013 Indian helicopter bribery scandal: arrests made including former Indian Air Force chief.

Public holidays

Publications
 "Devlok" by Devdutt Pattanaik
 "One Indian Girl" by Chetan Bhagat

Deaths

January
 2 January
 Ardhendu Bhushan Bardhan, Indian politician (b. 1924)
 Fateh Singh, shooter and army officer (b. 1964)
 3 January
 Shankar Prasad Jaiswal, Indian politician (b. 1932)
 Raghu Nandan Mandal, Indian politician (b. 1952)
 4 January – S. H. Kapadia, Indian judge (b. 1947)
 6 January – Labhshankar Thakar, Gujarati author (b. 1935)
 7 January – Mufti Mohammad Sayeed, Indian politician (b. 1936)
 8 January
 M. O. Joseph, Malayalam film producer (b. 1929)
 Gunaram Khanikar, herbalist (b. 1949)
 13 January
 J. F. R. Jacob, army general (b. 1923)
 G A Vadivelu, independence activist and politician (b. 1923)
 14 January – Rajesh Vivek, actor (b. 1949)
 15 January – Anil Ganguly, film director (b. 1933)
 16 January – Ananda Chandra Dutta, botanist (b. 1923)
 17 January
 Geethapriya, film director (b. 1932)
 V. Rama Rao, politician (b. 1935)
 Sudhindra Thirtha, Hindu religious leader (b. 1926)
Rohith Vemula, PhD scholar. (b. 1989)
 18 January – Asha Patil, actress (b. 1936)
 20 January – Subrata Bose, politician (b. 1932)
 21 January – Mrinalini Sarabhai, classical dancer, choreographer and instructor (b. 1918)
 22 January – Shankar Ghosh, tabla player (b. 1935)
 23 January – A. C. Jose, politician (b. 1937)
 25 January
 Kalpana, Malayalam actress (b. 1965)
 Jashubhai Dhanabhai Barad, politician (b. 1955)
 Padmarani, Gujarati actress (b. 1936)
 28 January – Maheswar Baug, politician and independence activist (b. 1930)
 29 January – Nayani Krishnakumari, writer and folklorist (b. 1930)
 30 January
 T. N. Gopakumar, journalist (b. 1957)
 K. V. Krishna Rao, military officer (b. 1923)
 Kollam G. K. Pillai, actor (b. 1933)
 31 January – Randhir Singh, political scientist (b. 1921)

February
 1 February – Kunigal Ramanath, 83, Kannada actor.
 3 February –
 Balram Jakhar, 92, politician, Speaker of the Lok Sabha (1980–1989).
 K. S. Paripoornan, 83, Supreme Court judge
 5 February – Markand Bhatt, 87, theatre director and actor.
 6 February – Sudhir Tailang, 55, cartoonist.
 8 February – Nida Fazli, 77, poet.
 13 February – O. N. V. Kurup, 84, poet, recipient of the Jnanpith Award (2007).
 17 February – Akbar Kakkattil, 62, writer.
 18 February –
 Abdul Rashid Khan, 107, Hindustani musician.
 Cherussery Zainuddeen Musliyar, 78, Indian religious scholar.
 20 February – Pradeep Shakti, 60, actor and restaurateur.
 21 February –
 Akbar Ali, 90, Kannada poet.
 Kalanidhi Narayanan, 87, classical dancer.
 25 February – Bhavarlal Jain, 78, businessman (Jain Irrigation Systems).
 26 February
 Mirza Mohammed Athar, 79, Muslim cleric.
 B. K. Garudachar, 99, cricket player.
 27 February
 Banda Jyothi, 41, comedian and actress.
 Rajesh Pillai, 41, film director (Traffic).
 28 February –
 Honey Chhaya, 85, film director and actor (The Best Exotic Marigold Hotel).
 Kumarimuthu, 76, comedian and film actor.
 29 February – Nihal Ahmed Maulavi Mohammed Usman, 90, politician, Maharashtra MLA (19601999), mayor of Malegaon.

June
 4 June – Sulabha Deshpande, 79, Veteran actress.

July
 23 July – S. H. Raza, Famous painter.

August
 9 August – Kalikho Pul, 47, former Chief Minister of Arunachal Pradesh

October
 10 October – Parmeshwar Godrej, 70, philanthropist and socialite.

November
 22 November
 M. Balamuralikrishna, 86, Carnatic vocalist
 M. G. K. Menon, 88, physicist

December
 5 December – Jayalalithaa, 68, Chief Minister of Tamil Nadu
 7 December – Cho Ramaswamy, 82, actor, political satirist, journalist, lawyer
 24 December – Chetan Ramarao, 76, Kannada film actor

See also

 2016 attacks on India
 Timeline of Indian history

References

 
India
Years of the 21st century in India
2010s in India
India